Military aviation occupations are types of work either shared with commercial aviation or unique to military aviation, that provide skills for the operation of an air forces business. Often military aviation employees will have had higher education due to the complexity of the electrical and mechanical systems involved in aircraft design and maintenance, in ground operations, in control of airspace and in the air.  

Military aviation occupations can be subdivided as follows:
 Military aviation engineering design
Airframe engineers
Fuel systems engineers
Instrumentation and electronics engineers
Weapon systems engineers
 Military aviation operations control (ground)
Runway design and maintenance
Aviation safety and crash recovery occupations
Air traffic control
Hangar operations
Air base operations
Air operations command
 Military aviation maintenance operations
Fleet operations
Conversion maintenance
Pre-flight maintenance 
Fuel operations occupations
Combat operations service
Weapons service
 Military aviation flight operations
Flight crew occupations
Weapons crew occupations
Cargo crew occupations
Passenger crew occupations
Specialist crew occupations
 Military aviation flight command  
Air command occupations
Air control occupations
Air communications occupations
Air search occupations
Air target acquisition occupations
Air search and rescue occupations

See also

Air Force Specialty Code